Liolaemus insolitus is a species of lizard in the family Liolaemidae. It is native to Peru.

References

insolitus
Lizards of South America
Reptiles of Peru
Endemic fauna of Peru
Taxa named by José Miguel Alfredo María Cei
Reptiles described in 1982